Franz Xaver Süssmayr (German: Franz Xaver Süßmayr, or Suessmayr in English; 1766 – September 17, 1803) was an Austrian composer and conductor. Popular in his day, he is now known primarily as the composer who completed Wolfgang Amadeus Mozart's unfinished Requiem. In addition, there have been performances of Süssmayr's operas at Kremsmünster, and his secular political cantata (1796), Der Retter in Gefahr, SmWV 302, received its first full performance in over 200 years in June 2012 in a new edition by Mark Nabholz, conducted by Terrence Stoneberg. There are also CD recordings of his unfinished clarinet concerto (completed by Michael Freyhan), one of his German requiems, and his Missa Solemnis in D.

Works
His works include the following:

 Two masses (SmWV 101–102)
 Two requiems (SmWV 103–104)
 Seven offertories (SmWV 112–115, 117–119, 123, 125, 144–145, 156)
 A gradual (SmWV 143)
 Psalms
 A magnificat
 Hymns
 Agonia e morte di Mozart (fantasia for piano)
 Nicht mehr als sechs Schüsseln (SmWV 205)
 Moses oder der Auszug aus Ägypten (SmWV 209)
 Der Spiegel von Arkadien (SmWV 213)
 List und Zufall (SmWV 224)

Of special note may be the clarinet concerto (SmWV 501) he most probably wrote for Mozart's clarinetist Anton Stadler, because it was scored for the basset clarinet. Recordings of the work by Dieter Klöcker (on Novalis) on "normal clarinet" and by Thea King (on Hyperion) in a reconstructed version for basset clarinet by Michael Freyhan are available. In 2021 a completion appropriate for period basset clarinet was published by Craig Hill.

Ballet 
 , ballet by Salvatore Viganò, premiered at La Scala on 25 April 1812. It gave an inspiration to Niccolò Paganini for creating Le Streghe, Variations on a theme from the ballet Il noce di Benevento (Op. 8, 1813).

References

Sources 
Books
 
 
 
 

Articles
 Freyhan, Michael: "Towards the Original Text of Mozart's Die Zauberflote" in Journal of the American Musicological Society, Summer 1986, no. 2, pp. 355–380
 Freyhan, Michael: "Rediscovery of the 18th Century Scores and Parts of 'Die Zauberflote' showing the Text Used at the Hamburg Premiere in 1793" in Mozart Jahrbuch 1997, pp. 109–149
 Lorenz, Michael: "Süßmayr und die Lichterputzer. Von gefundenen und erfundenen Quellen", in Mozart Jahrbuch 2006

Editions
 Franz Xaver Süßmayr, Der Spiegel von Arkadien (Vienna, 1794), edited by David J. Buch, Recent Researches in the Music of the Classical Era, vols. 93–94 (Middleton, Wisconsin: A-R Editions, 2014)

External links 
 Süßmayr-Werk-Verzeichnis: catalogue of Süßmayr's works
 

1766 births
1803 deaths
People from Schwanenstadt
Austrian classical composers
Austrian opera composers
Male opera composers
Austrian Classical-period composers
Music copyists
Pupils of Antonio Salieri
19th-century deaths from tuberculosis
19th-century male musicians
Tuberculosis deaths in Austria